Dorothy Abbott (December 16, 1920 – December 15, 1968) was an American actress.

Career
Born in Kansas City, Missouri, Abbott acted in Little Theater productions to gain experience before she ventured into films.

She appeared in many films between the 1940s and 1960s as an extra. In Las Vegas, she was a showgirl at the Flamingo Hotel and was known as "the girl with the golden arm". She also appeared in guest roles on The Ford Television Theatre, Leave It to Beaver, and Dragnet as Sergeant Joe Friday's girlfriend, Ann Baker. When she could not find work as an actress, she modeled and sold real estate.

Death
Depressed about the end of her marriage to police officer and actor Rudy Diaz, Abbott committed suicide in Los Angeles on December 15, 1968, a day before her 48th birthday. Abbott is buried under her married name of Dorothy Diaz in Rose Hills Memorial Park in Whittier, California.

Filmography

References

External links

 
 
 

1920 births
1968 deaths
American film actresses
American television actresses
Suicides in California
Actresses from Kansas City, Missouri
20th-century American actresses
Burials at Rose Hills Memorial Park
1968 suicides